Emperor Ming of Jin (299 – 18 October 325, personal name Sima Shao (司馬紹), courtesy name Daoji (道畿), was an emperor of the Eastern Jin dynasty of China. During his brief reign (323–325), he led the weakened Jin out of domination by the warlord Wang Dun, but at his early death, the empire was left to his young son Emperor Cheng, and the fragile balance of power that he created was soon broken, leading to the Su Jun Disturbance and weakening the Jin state even further.

Early life
Sima Shao was born in 299, as the oldest son of his father Sima Rui, then the Prince of Langya, by his lowly-born concubine Lady Xun, who then in 300 gave birth to another son, Sima Pou (司馬裒).  Sima Rui's wife, Princess Yu Mengmu (虞孟母), who was herself childless, became very jealous of Lady Xun and mistreated her greatly.  Lady Xun, not able to bear the abuse, complained bitterly, and was thrown out of the household.  Sima Shao was therefore raised by Princess Yu, with whom he apparently had a cordial relationship.  During his youth, he was considered intelligent and quick-thinking, although eventually his brother Sima Pou became more favored by their father.

While Sima Rui served as Left Prime Minister under Emperor Min, the teenage Sima Shao was put in charge of defending Guangling.  After Sima Rui declared himself the Prince of Jin following Emperor Min's capture by Han Zhao in 316, he initially wanted to make Sima Pou his crown prince, but after Wang Dao pointed out that traditionally the older son should succeed him, he created Sima Shao crown prince.  Sima Shao remained in that status after his father declared himself emperor (as Emperor Yuan) in 318, after Han Zhao executed Emperor Min.

As crown prince
While crown prince, Sima Shao was known for seeking out talented men and befriending them, treating them as friends and not as subordinates.  These included Wang Dao, Yu Liang (whose sister Yu Wenjun he married), Wen Jiao, Huan Yi (桓彝), and Ruan Fang (阮放).  He was also known for his filial piety and his literary studies.  He later also added martial arts to his studies, and he often visited troops to encourage them.

When Wang Dun rebelled against Emperor Yuan in 322, the capital Jiankang fell easily to Wang.  Upon hearing news that Wang had breached Jiankang's defenses, Crown Prince Shao was going to himself make a last stand, but Wen stopped him by cutting off the ropes off his horse.  When Wang subsequently forced Emperor Yuan into submission, he considered deposing Crown Prince Shao by falsely accusing Crown Prince Shao of being disobedient to Emperor Yuan.  However, Wen prevented this by publicly praising Crown Prince Shao of filial piety, making Wang's putative accusations not credible.

Early in 323, Emperor Yuan died in distress after his defeat by Wang.  Crown Prince Shao succeeded to the throne as Emperor Ming.

Reign
One of the first things that Emperor Ming did was locating his birth mother Lady Xun, putting her in a mansion, and creating her the Lady of Jian'an.  However, perhaps out of respect for his deceased stepmother Princess Yu (who had died in 312 but was posthumously honored as an empress), he never gave her an empress dowager title—and Emperor Ming honored Princess Yu's family as appropriately he would a mother's family—and he was particularly close to Princess Yu's brother Yu Yin (虞胤).  A few months after he took the throne, Lady Xun moved into the palace.  Emperor Ming also created his wife, Crown Princess Yu, empress.

Wang Dun did not think much of the new emperor, and he plotted usurping the throne.  In summer 323, he had Emperor Ming summon him to the capital, but actually did not go to the capital, but only moved his headquarters from Wuchang (武昌, in modern Ezhou, Hubei) to Gushu (姑孰, in modern Ma'anshan, Anhui), closer to the capital, and also taking over the governorship of the capital province.  When Emperor Ming tried to commission the official Chi Jian as the military commander at Hefei, positionally behind Wang, Wang resisted, and Emperor Ming was forced to recall Chi.

In 324, Wang Dun grew ill, and became resolved to overthrow Jin so that his adopted son, Wang Ying (王應), could be emperor.  (This was after his initial two inclinations—ordering that his troops be disbanded after his death, or having Wang Ying continue to control his troops but pledging allegiance to Emperor Ming—were rejected by his strategists.) He also made Wen Jiao, by that point a trusted assistant, the mayor of Jiankang, to keep an eye on the emperor—forgetting that Wen was loyal to Emperor Ming, and upon arrival in Jiankang, Wen informed Emperor Ming of Wang's plans, as well as his illness.  Wang Dao, also loyal to Emperor Ming, then falsely declared to the imperial forces that Wang Dun had died, further increasing their morale, and Emperor Ming reinforced his troops by summoning battle-tested soldiers from the northern borders with Later Zhao back to the capital.  (When the generals in command of these forces, Su Jun and Liu Xia (劉遐) arrived at Jiankang, even though it was dark in the night, Emperor Ming went to personally visit the troops, greatly enhancing their morale.) Wang Dun then sent his forces east to Jiankang, headed by his brother Wang Han (王含, Wang Ying's biological father) and Qian Feng (錢鳳), but could not decisively defeat the imperial troops.  The imperial troops then attacked by, defeating Wang Han.  Wang Dun, upon hearing initial news of defeat, died.  The imperial forces then defeated Wang Han's troops more completely, forcing Wang Han and Wang Ying to flee, but they were captured by Wang Dun's brother Wang Shu (王舒), who executed them by drowning to show his loyalty.

In 325, Emperor Ming posthumously awarded officials who had died at Wang Dun's hands throughout the years with titles and honors.  He also put the general Tao Kan, known for his military and governing capabilities, in charge of most of Wang Dun's former domain, including the key Jing Province (荊州, modern Hubei).

In fall 325, Emperor Ming grew ill.  He entrusted his four-year-old son, Crown Prince Yan, to a group of high-level officials, including Sima Yang (司馬羕) the Prince of Xiyang, Wang Dao, Bian Kun (卞壼), Chi Jian, Yu Liang, Lu Ye (陸瞱), and Wen Jiao, perhaps intending that they lead by group with a balance of power.  He died soon thereafter—only 26 years old.  The balance of power that he left was soon broken, however, as Empress Dowager Yu became the regent, and her brother Yu Liang became the most powerful of the officials, eventually offending Su Jun and Zu Yue into a rebellion that damaged Jin for years.

Era name
 Taining (太寧, tài níng): 22 April 323 – 15 April 326

Family
Consorts and Issue:
 Empress Mingmu, of the Yu clan of Yingchuan (297–328), personal name Wenjun
 Princess Nankang, personal name Xingnan
 Married Huan Wen of Qiao, Duke Nan (312–373)
 Sima Yan, Emperor Cheng (321–342), first son
 Sima Yue, Emperor Kang (322–344), second son
 Unknown
 Princess Luling (d. 357), personal name Nandi
 Married Liu Tan of Pei
 Princess Nandao
 Married Yang Bi of Taishan

Ancestry

References

 Book of Jin, vol. 6.
 Zizhi Tongjian, vols. 90, 92, 93.

299 births
325 deaths
Jin dynasty (266–420) emperors
4th-century Chinese monarchs